Castelo de Idanha-a-Velha is a castle in Idanha-a-Velha, Idanha-a-Nova municipality, Portugal. It is classified as a National Monument.

See also
Idanha-a-Velha

Castles in Portugal
Castle Idanha Velha
Idanha-a-Velha